Metisotoma is a genus of elongate-bodied springtails in the family Isotomidae. There are at least two described species in Metisotoma.

Species
These two species belong to the genus Metisotoma:
 Metisotoma grandiceps (Reuter, 1891)
 Metisotoma spiniseta Maynard, 1951

References

Further reading

 

Collembola
Articles created by Qbugbot
Springtail genera